An oblivious RAM (ORAM) simulator is a compiler that transforms algorithms in such a way that the resulting algorithms preserve the input-output behavior of the original algorithm but the distribution of memory access pattern of the transformed algorithm is independent of the memory access pattern of the original algorithm. 

The use of ORAMs is motivated by the fact that an adversary can obtain nontrivial information about the execution of a program and the nature of the data that it is dealing with, just by observing the pattern in which various locations of memory are accessed during its execution. An adversary can get this information even if the data values are all encrypted. 

The definition suits equally well to the settings of protected programs running on unprotected shared memory as well as a client running a program on its system by accessing previously stored data on a remote server. The concept was formulated by Oded Goldreich and Rafail Ostrovsky in 1996.

Definition

A Turing machine (TM), the mathematical abstraction of a real computer (program), is said to be oblivious if for any two inputs of the same length, the motions of the tape heads remain the same. A more realistic model of computation is the RAM model. In the RAM model of computation, there is a CPU that can execute the basic mathematical, logical and control instructions. The CPU is also associated with a few registers and a physical random access memory, where it stores the operands of its instructions. The CPU in addition has instructions to read the contents of a memory cell and write a specific value to a memory cell. The definition of ORAMs capture a similar notion of obliviousness memory accesses in this model.

Informally, an ORAM is an algorithm at the interface of a protected CPU and the physical RAM such that it acts like a RAM to the CPU by querying the physical RAM for the CPU while hiding information about the actual memory access pattern of the CPU from the physical RAM. In other words, the distribution of memory accesses of two programs that make the same number of memory accesses to the RAM are indistinguishable from each other. This description will still make sense if the CPU is replaced by a client with a small storage and the physical RAM is replaced with a remote server with a large storage capacity, where the data of the client resides.

The following is a formal definition of ORAMs. Let  denote a program requiring a memory of size  when executing on an input .

 Correctness: For any  and any string , with probability at least , .

Note that the above definition uses the notion of statistical security. One can also have a similar definition for the notion of computational security.

History of ORAMs

ORAMs were introduced by Goldreich and Ostrovsky
 wherein the key motivation was stated as software protection from an adversary who can observe the memory access pattern (but not the contents of the memory).

The main result in this work  is that there exists an ORAM compiler that uses  server space and incurs a running time overhead of  when making a program that uses  memory cells oblivious. This work initiated a series of works in the construction of oblivious RAMs that is going on till date. There are several attributes that need to be considered when we compare various ORAM constructions. The most important parameters of an ORAM construction are the amounts of client storage, the amount of server storage and the time overhead in making one memory access. Based on these attributes, the construction of Kushilevitz et al. is the best known ORAM construction. It achieves  client storage,  server storage and  access overhead.

Another important attribute of an ORAM construction is whether the access overhead is amortized or worst-case. Several of the earlier ORAM constructions have good amortized access overhead guarantees, but have  worst-case access overheads. Some of the ORAM constructions with polylogarithmic worst-case computational overheads are. The constructions of were for the random oracle model, where the client assumes access to an oracle that behaves like a random function and returns consistent answers for repeated queries. They also noted that this oracle could be replaced by a pseudorandom function whose seed is a secret key stored by the client, if one assumes the existence of one-way functions. The papers were aimed at removing this assumption completely.

While most of the earlier works focus on proving security computationally, there are more recent works that use the stronger statistical notion of security.

One of the only known lower bounds on the access overhead of ORAMs is due to Goldreich et al. They show a  lower bound for ORAM access overhead, where  is the data size. There is also a conditional lower bound on the access overhead of ORAMs due to Boyle et al. that relates this quantity with that of the size of sorting networks.

ORAM constructions

Trivial construction

A trivial ORAM simulator construction, for each read or write operation, reads from and writes to every single element in the array, only performing a meaningful action for the address specified in that single operation. The trivial solution thus, scans through the entire memory for each operation.

A simple ORAM scheme

A simple version of a statistically secure ORAM compiler constructed by Chung and Pass is described in the following along with an overview of the proof of its correctness. The compiler on input  and a program  with its memory requirement , outputs an equivalent oblivious program .

The ORAM compiler is very simple to describe. It may be noted that this construction can be made to work even for memory requests coming in an online fashion.

Memory organization of the oblivious program

The program  stores a complete binary tree  of depth  in its memory. Thus, there are at most  blocks in total. In other words, the memory cell  corresponds to block .

Each node in  contains an array with at most  triples.

Description of the oblivious program

The sub-routine  is given below. The inputs to the sub-routine are a memory location  and the value  to be stored at the location . It has three main phases, namely FETCH, PUT_BACK and FLUSH.

     input: a location , a value 

     Procedure FETCH     // Search for the required block.
                    //  is the block containing .
                    //  is 's component in the block .
          
          flag .
          for each node  on the path from root to  do
               if  has a triple of the form  then
                    flag .
               else
     Procedure PUT_BACK     // Add back the updated block at the root.
          if flag then
          else
          if there is space left in the root then
          else
               Abort outputting overflow.
     Procedure FLUSH     // Push the blocks present in a random path as far down as possible.
          for each triple  in the nodes traversed the path from root to 
               if at any point some bucket is about to overflow then
                    Abort outputting overflow.

The task of the FETCH phase is to look for the location  in the tree . Suppose  is the leaf associated with the block containing location . Otherwise, it simply writes back the whole node .

The last phase, which is called FLUSH, is an additional operation to release the memory cells in the root and other higher internal nodes. It aborts outputting an overflow if at any point some bucket is about to overflow its capacity.

In the FETCH stage, if it does not find a triple corresponding to the location , it returns  as the value at location . In the PUT_BACK phase, it will write back the same block that it read to the root, after associating it with a freshly sampled uniformly random leaf.

Correctness of the simple ORAM scheme

Let  stand for the ORAM compiler that was described above. Given a program , let  denote . Let  denote the execution of the program  on an input  using  memory cells. Let  denote a function such that for any , for any program  and for any input , the probability that  outputs an overflow is at most .

It is easy to see that each  and  operation traverses root to leaf paths in  chosen uniformly and independently at random. 
This fact implies that the distribution of memory access patterns of any two programs that make the same number of memory accesses are indistinguishable, if they both do not overflow.

The following lemma completes the proof of correctness of the ORAM scheme.

Overflow LemmaThere exists a negligible function  such that for every program , every  and input , the program  outputs overflow with probability at most .

Computational and memory overheads

This takes  time.

Each triple stored in the tree has  words in it and thus there are  words per node of the tree.

References

See also
 Oblivious data structure
 Cache-oblivious algorithm

Models of computation
Cache (computing)
Analysis of algorithms